Barry James Round (26 January 1950 – 24 December 2022) was an Australian rules footballer. He played 328 games (135 for Footscray and 193 for South Melbourne/Sydney), won a Brownlow Medal in 1981 (tying with his former teammate Bernie Quinlan) and was the Swans' first captain during the Sydney era.

After retirement from VFL football, he played and coached for several years for Williamstown in the Victorian Football Association, the second-highest level of football in Victoria, where he participated in their 1986 and captain-coached their 1990 premiership teams. He won the association best and fairest award, the J. J. Liston Trophy, in 1987 and won the 1990 Norm Goss Memorial Medal for best on field in the Grand Final.

Round captained the Williamstown Football Club in the 1989–1991 seasons, and he coached the club from 1989 to 1993. During his short time at the club, Round won 3 consecutive Gerry Callahan Medals (Williamstown best and fairest award) between 1987 and 1989. In 2009, Barry Round was named in the Williamstown Team of the Century in the Ruck Position. In May 2014, Williamstown FC held their 150-year celebration and inducted Round as part of their inaugural Hall Of Fame team. On the same night, he was elevated to Legend status at the club, being one of only five players to receive the honour.

In 2001, Round was inducted into the Australian Football Hall of Fame with a citation that read: "Lion-hearted big man who represented Footscray and Sydney with distinction". He was also a member of Sydney's Team of the Century, which was announced in 2003.

In 2005, Round appeared on The AFL Footy Show's singing competition, "Screamers".

Barry Round died from organ failure on 24 December 2022, at age 72. His son is David Round, who won the Williamstown best and fairest award in 1999.

Career highlights

Playing career
 1969–1985 (games: 328, goals: 293)
 Footscray 1969–1975 (games: 135, goals: 136)
 South Melbourne/Sydney 1976–1985 (games: 193, goals: 157)

Player honours
 Brownlow Medal 1981
 Liston Trophy 1987
 South Melbourne/Sydney best and fairest 1979, 1981
 South Melbourne/Sydney captain 1980–1984
 South Melbourne/Sydney Team of the Century
 VFL representative (5 games, 4 goals)
 VFA representative (3 games, 4 goals)

References

External links 
AFL: Hall of Fame

1950 births
2022 deaths
Brownlow Medal winners
Bob Skilton Medal winners
Sydney Swans players
Western Bulldogs players
Australian Football Hall of Fame inductees
Williamstown Football Club players
Williamstown Football Club coaches
Warragul Football Club players
J. J. Liston Trophy winners
Australian rules footballers from Victoria (Australia)